was a Japanese aristocrat and former Imperial prince. The first grandchild of Emperor Hirohito, he was the eldest son of Shigeko, Princess Teru, the Emperor's eldest child. He was thus a maternal nephew of the Emperor Emeritus Akihito. His father was Morihiro Higashikuni, a grandson of Emperor Meiji.

Biography 
He was born in a shelter home amid the air raid on Tokyo as the eldest son of Prince Morihiro Higashikuni and Shigeko, Princess Teru, the eldest daughter of Hirohito, then the reigning Emperor of Japan.

After departing from the Imperial Palace, he studied at the Keio University Law School and worked at Mitsui Bank. He was appointed as a member of the Thai Association of Japan, and subsequently the executive director, managing director, Kakari member, etc. In June 2008, he assumed the honorary presidency of the All Japan Baseball Conference. In July 2009, he assumed the role of honorary adviser of the Japan-US Friendship Bridge Executive Committee. Other positions held by Higashikuni were; Honorary Chairman of the Society "Togo Association" and Honorary President of the Association to Protect Japanese Tradition.

Higashikuni married Yoshiko Shimada in June 1972. The Shimada family is a commoner family which runs a real estate management business (apartment/parking lot management) in Yokohama, but Emperor Hirohito liked Shimada's homely appearance and blessed Nobuhiko's marriage. In the following year a boy, Masahiko, was born to the couple.

Ancestry
Since his parents and grandparents were all members of the Imperial House of Japan and very closely related to the senior members of the family, the existence of Nobuhiko and his son, Masahiko, has been noted when discussing the problem of succession to the throne due to the scarcity of male royalty, especially before 2006.

References 

|-

1945 births
2019 deaths
Keio University alumni
People from Tokyo
Japanese princes
Higashikuni-no-miya
20th-century Japanese businesspeople
Japanese bankers
21st-century Japanese businesspeople